Jakob Brendel (18 September 1907 in Speyer - 13 February 1964) was a German wrestler and Olympic champion in Greco-Roman wrestling.

Olympics
Brendel competed at the 1932 Summer Olympics in Los Angeles where he received a gold medal in Greco-Roman wrestling, the bantamweight class.

References

External links

1907 births
1964 deaths
Olympic wrestlers of Germany
Wrestlers at the 1932 Summer Olympics
Wrestlers at the 1936 Summer Olympics
German male sport wrestlers
Olympic gold medalists for Germany
Olympic bronze medalists for Germany
Olympic medalists in wrestling
Medalists at the 1936 Summer Olympics
Medalists at the 1932 Summer Olympics
People from Speyer
Sportspeople from Rhineland-Palatinate